The Twilights were an Australian rock band that formed in Adelaide in 1964. The band developed from a three-piece acapella group consisting of Glenn Shorrock, Mike Sykes and Clem "Paddy" McCartney, who merged with instrumental group the Hurricanes. Heavily influenced by the British Invasion, they were one of the most significant Australian bands of the 1960s. They were noted for their musicianship, on-stage humor, and adoption of overseas sounds and trends.

The band became popular nationally in 1966 after the success of their cover of "Needle In A Haystack" by the Velvetettes, which topped the Go-Set chart. Later that year, they won the Hoadley's Battle of the Sounds competition and were awarded a trip to England. The band's attempt to establish themselves in England was largely unsuccessful, though the stint yielded a hit in their home country; "What's Wrong With The Way I Live?", written for them by members of the Hollies, and a shift in the band's sound influenced by the psychedelic movement by the time they returned to Australia in 1967, where they continued to achieve success. In 1968, the band filmed the pilot for a Monkees-style sitcom for the Seven Network, which did not go forward. Following a period of decline and the departure of longtime manager Gary Spry, the Twilights disbanded at beginning of 1969.

Shorrock later formed Axiom and joined Esperanto, before gaining worldwide success with Little River Band. Guitarist Terry Britten became an internationally successful songwriter, writing songs for artists such as Cliff Richard and Tina Turner.

History

1964–1965
The Twilights formed in the satellite town of Elizabeth, 20 km north of Adelaide in South Australia in 1964, a town whose population in the 1960s was largely made up of families who had recently migrated from the UK, and all the original members were born in Britain. Like many other nascent pop bands, the Twilights were strongly affected by the Beatles' film A Hard Day's Night and other emerging British beat groups, notably the Hollies, the Who and the Small Faces, and they kept abreast of the latest trends with packages of records and tape recordings of Top 40 radio shows that they regularly received from relatives in Britain. Drawn together by their common origins and musical interests, singer Glenn Shorrock (hailing originally from Kent, England), and his friends Mike Sykes and Clem "Paddy" McCartney (born in Belfast, Northern Ireland) formed an a cappella trio, eventually gaining regular bookings around the small Adelaide folk/coffee-house circuit.

Occasionally, and especially for more prestige engagements, this original vocal three-piece teamed up with local instrumental outfits, including The Vector Men and The Hurricanes. Typical of the era, the Hurricanes had started out as a Shadows-style instrumental act, but the impact of the Beatles and other "British Invasion" bands saw many guitar bands around Australia recruiting lead singers and changing over to vocal-based material. The Twilights and The Hurricanes developed a solid bond, leading to the formation of the six-piece, fully electric-and-vocal group, The Twilights.

Still based in Adelaide, and originally self-managed and produced, the band released their debut single, "I'll Be Where You Are", on EMI's Columbia imprint in June 1965. A ballad written by Shorrock and Britten, the single gained some airplay in Melbourne but failed to chart outside Adelaide. Subsequent singles made further inroads – the second release, "Wanted To Sell", cracked the Melbourne charts and the third, the brisk, Beatles-styled Brideoake/Britten original "If She Finds Out" gave the band its first chart success in Melbourne, Sydney and Brisbane.

The Twilights quickly gained a strong reputation for their dynamic live shows in Adelaide. Early in 1965, drummer Frank Barnard left the group after the band hired Gary Spry as their manager. Barnard was replaced by Laurie Pryor, a well-known local drumming prodigy, who had previously played with another popular Adelaide band, Johnny Broome & The Handels. The new Twilights line-up with Pryor remained intact for the rest of the life of the band.

After taking over the group's management, Melbourne promoter Gary Spry realised that it was essential to establish the group in Australia's pop capital, Melbourne. The Twilights moved there in late 1965, where they took up a three-month residency at Spry's discothèque, Pinocchio's. Their reputation quickly spread around Melbourne; the club was sold out every night and they were soon being booked by all the major disco and dance promoters in the city.

1966
The band's first recording after relocating to Melbourne was a version of the Animals song "Baby Let Me Take You Home", which marked the beginning of their successful collaboration with EMI house producer David Mackay; it gained a minor chart placing in Melbourne but made no impact in other cities.

The Twilights fared much better with their next two releases. Their fourth single was a cover of Larry Williams' "Bad Boy" (June 1966). 
Their biggest national chart success came with their cover of the Velvelettes' "Needle in a Haystack" (August 1966). Although the group was reportedly not keen on the song, manager Gary Spry insisted that they record it and it made the Top 10 in all Australian states. This was a notable achievement at the time—prior to late 1966 there was no recognised national pop chart and most Australia capital-city radio stations (especially in Sydney and Melbourne) were still highly parochial in their choice of material, rarely playing songs by acts from other states.

The popularity of "Needle in a Haystack" also took the single to the top of the new National Top 40 published for the first time in early October 1966 in Go-Set magazine. The single entered the inaugural 5 October chart at No. 14 and within two weeks it had shot to No. 1, becoming the first Australian recording to reach No. 1 on the Go-Set chart, out-charting overseas competitors including The Beatles "Yellow Submarine", Donovan's "Sunshine Superman" and The Lovin' Spoonful's "Summer in the City". It topped the Go-Set chart for two weeks in mid-October 1966, remaining in the chart for the rest of the year and into mid-January 1967.

Their follow-up single, "You Got Soul" entered the Go-Set chart on 18 January 1967 but was not as successful, peaking at No. 26 nationally. However, these successes, together with the release of their self-titled first album and numerous appearances on TV pop shows, cemented the band's status as one of Australia's most popular new groups.

Their debut album, also produced by David Mackay, demonstrated the group's diversity as a recording unit and showcased their major influences. It featured several original tunes, songs specially written for them by Barry Gibb and Hans Poulsen, and covers of concert favourites including The Yardbirds' "I'm Not Talkin'", The Who's "La La La Lies", The Moody Blues' "Let Me Go", The Hollies' "Yes I Will" and The Rolling Stones' "(I Can't Get No) Satisfaction".

In July 1966, at Festival Hall, Melbourne, The Twilights competed in the first national final of the prestigious new pop band competition, the Hoadley's Battle of the Sounds, emerging as winners from a field of more than 500 groups. They were awarded bonus points for sound, originality, presentation and audience reaction. The competition rule which set maximum group membership at five meant that Paddy McCartney (half of the band's twin lead vocal line-up) had to sit out for the band's winning performance, but he returned to the stage for the winner's encore.

The competition first prize was a trip to the UK on the Sitmar cruise line and on 26 September 1966, the group embarked for London on the passenger liner Castel Felice.

1967
As soon as they disembarked from at Southampton, the group made a bee-line for all the essential landmarks of Swinging London. They were soon sporting out the latest Mod hairstyles and Carnaby Street clothes and grew moustaches, emulating the new trend set by The Beatles. Although they had high hopes of success, they were dismayed by the quality of the British groups they encountered. Shorrock observed upon the band's return to Australia:

"Our biggest shock was the high standard of so many groups who are not even known. It was hard for us to get jobs with good money".

One major achievement was the opportunity to play a week's residency at Liverpool's Cavern club to an enthusiastic response. Thanks to their contract with EMI, the band also had the chance to record at the Abbey Road Studios, teaming with the producer-engineer Norman "Hurricane" Smith, who had been the engineer on almost all The Beatles 1962–1966 recordings and who went on to produce Pink Floyd's debut album (The Piper at the Gates of Dawn) and The Pretty Things psychedelic concept album S.F. Sorrow. The Beatles themselves were at that time recording their classic single "Penny Lane" and The Twilights were invited to sit in and observe their sessions.

A clutch of songs from the Abbey Road sessions were soon released back in Australia and, in February 1967, their version of The Hollies' "What's Wrong with the Way I Live?" rapidly rose into the national Top 10. Composed specially for the Twilights by Graham Nash, Tony Hicks and Allan Clarke, the song exhibited a sophisticated sound that the band had only hinted at before. With its banjo motif and tight block harmonies, the recording earned plaudits from the composers themselves ("Much better than we did it!", Nash is said to have remarked) – and garnered support from other expatriate Aussie musicians like The Bee Gees, as well as earning encouraging airplay on pirate radio stations like Radio Caroline, where a number of expatriate Australian DJs were working. The B-side, "9.50", a driving Terry Britten psychedelic rocker, proved equally popular in Australia and was revived by Divinyls as a single B-side in the early 1980s.

For a short time it appeared that the single might make it into the UK Singles Chart, but just as it was gaining airplay momentum it was derailed by the release of the Hollies' own version of their album, which EMI issued despite an earlier agreement not to do so. Extremely disappointed, The Twilights decided amongst themselves to return on the next boat home without telling Gary Spry, their manager, who was back in Australia. He reportedly rang to tell them that they had been booked to appear on Top of the Pops, Britain's leading television pop show, only to find they had already been at sea for a week.

The third song recorded during the Abbey Road sessions provided the next Australian A-side. "Young Girl" was a melancholy and evocative Laurie Pryor tune, featuring Terry Britten's innovative use of the variable volume pedal.

The changes in looks, attitude and musical accomplishment evident in the band upon its return to Australia were exemplified by the increasing dominance of lead guitarist and songwriter Terry Britten. Of all the Twilights, the Manchester-born Britten most fully absorbed the kaleidoscopic influences on offer in the musical melting pot of London. His rapid creative growth during this time saw him assume the role of chief songwriter and leader. Like his hero George Harrison, Britten embraced elements of Eastern philosophy and religion, and he introduced exotic instruments and musical forms into The Twilights' music, such as his use of the sitar as a lead instrument on the B-side of the "Young Girl" single, a social observation called "Time And Motion Study Man".

The last single from the group in 1967, "Cathy Come Home" b/w "The Way They Play", also featured the sitar prominently on both sides, and unusually for the time it was issued in a two-colour picture sleeve. The A-side was inspired by the BBC-TV play of the same name and to promote it they filmed one of the earliest Australian music video clips. The single was another airplay and chart success, but it was the last major hit that the band enjoyed. "Cathy Come Home" also began a trend in which Britten wrote songs inspired by movies or TV shows, which continued through his later writing. He wrote a song for Ronnie Burns, around another Aussie-produced film, Age of Consent, which was submitted but rejected for the soundtrack of the Michael Powell film of the same name, and he released his own solo single in 1969, again inspired by a current movie, Tim Burstall's 2000 Weeks.

Thanks to a precious acetate of the album which they brought back from London, The Twilights were playing the whole of The Beatles' Sgt Pepper album live, in order, from start to finish, weeks before its official release in Australia. Staff at EMI are reported to have demanded that the Twilights desist, fearing their performance might actually harm sales of the album when it was finally issued in June.

1968
This year began promisingly for the Twilights with the chart success of "Cathy Come Home" and this was consolidated by an invitation from the Seven Network to develop a weekly television sit-com series, showing the group at work and play, based on the success of The Monkees television series and the Beatles' A Hard Day's Night film.

Go-Set magazine documented the making of the pilot for the series, called Once Upon A Twilight, with photos of the group on location around Melbourne with their co-stars, comedian Mary Hardy (playing the role of the band's secretary) and a youthful Ronnie Burns. However, the program's sponsor, the Ford Motor Company, withdrew its support later in the year and the project was cancelled, although it did inspire what was to become the Twilights' most notable recording achievement.

The music the group had intended for the soundtrack to the shelved series took on a life of its own. After long gestation period, interspersed with the band's most concentrated regime of live touring yet, they produced what many critics now regard as one of the best Australian pop albums of the era, Once Upon A Twilight.

The album set new standards in Australia for pop album production and packaging – it was one of the first Australian pop LPs to be released in both mono and stereo and was also issued in a lavish gatefold cover which included die-cut pop-up figures of the band members. The track listing included compositions by several band members – Peter Brideoake's plaintive cello and horn-embellished "Tomorrow Is Today" and Laurie Pryor's raucous comedy song "The Cocky Song" as well as several new Terry Britten songs. As main songwriter he provided lush settings for Shorrock, including the title track "Found To Be Thrown Away" and also "Paternosta Row" (which featured heavily processed lead vocals), plus delicate arrangements for Paddy McCartney's featured number, "Bessemae".  Britten sang lead vocals and almost solo instrumentation on "Mr Nice" and "Devendra", the latter featuring an arrangement of Indian string and percussion reminiscent of George Harrison's "Within You, Without You".  Throughout the LP, the group employed exotic instruments, brass sections, string quartets, wah-wah guitar, feedback, Keith Moon-styled drum patterns, reverse tape effects, stereo panning and electronically treated vocals.

Once Upon A Twilight was initially pressed in mono only, as the stereo mix commissioned in America was delayed. An anecdote recorded by rock historian Glenn A. Baker says that Linda Ronstadt and her band, the Stone Poneys (including Anglophile songwriter Andrew Gold and future Eagle Glenn Frey), were recording in an adjacent studio and heard some of the mixing sessions. Impressed with the quality of the songs and performances, Ronstadt and her manager apparently lobbied to secure American release for the Twilights on Capitol Records.

Concurrent with the release of the album came the group's eleventh single, "Always", recorded during the same sessions. Both the LP and the single, however, fared poorly on the charts, signalling the beginning of a downturn in the group's fortunes.

Nevertheless, 1968 was the band's peak year as a performing unit. They remained one of the biggest drawcards on Melbourne's thriving dance and disco circuit. Popular venues such as Sebastian's, Bertie's, Pinnochios, Catcher, The Thumpin' Tum and Opus played host to some of the most polished stage shows by an Australian band yet witnessed. The group were the envy of local musicians due to the fact that they were one of the first bands in Australia to be equipped with the new British-made Marshall amplifiers (made famous by Jimi Hendrix) and the combination of their powerful stage sound, impeccable presentation and tight musicianship .

The Twilights' shows at the time also had a prominent comedy and slapstick element. Glenn Shorrock frequently adopted a comedic alter-ego, "Superdroop", dressing in a shabby super-hero jumpsuit (which can be seen in the "Cathy Come Home" film clip) and he was also notorious for terrorising audiences by leaping out from backstage dressed in a gorilla suit, sometimes swinging precariously on a trapeze over the crowd. Alongside their own material and selections of popular Motown and soul classics, the group also regularly performed cover versions of recent hits, such as Cream's "Sunshine of Your Love", Traffic's "Dear Mr. Fantasy", Hendrix's "Purple Haze", the Small Faces' "Tin Soldier" and the Move's "Night of Fear". 

The Twilights' next single, "Tell Me Goodbye" / "Comin' On Down" (August 1968), was recorded at Armstrong's Studios in Melbourne and proved to be their last collaboration with long-time producer David MacKay, but it was largely ignored by radio and the public and failed to chart.

By late 1968, however, internal frictions were growing—the group were disillusioned by the dwindling interest of their label and the consequent lack of chart success and were also growing tired of the constant and gruelling routine of live performance; at that time it was common for popular local acts to play multiple nightly appearances (often as many as five or more every night) at dances and discotheques. Their situation was further complicated by the loss of manager Spry, who had quit as manager in mid-1968 due to the band's insistence that he relinquish his other activities to concentrate on the Twilights—by this point Spry was concurrently running his discotheque, managing two other acts (The Groove and the female vocal group Marcie and the Cookies) as well as operating his AMBO booking agency.

November saw the release of their swansong record, this time produced by an expatriate New Zealander, Howard Gable, who had recently taken over as EMI's house producer from the departing Mackay who had taken up a position at EMI's London head office. "Sand in the Sandwiches" attempted to purvey a jaunty and frivolous "let's all head off for the beach" theme but failed to achieve its intention; even rock historian and self-confessed Twilights fan Glenn A. Baker later described it as "abysmal". By contrast, the b-side, "Lotus", showcased all the band's strengths, but again it gained little airplay and sales were negligible.

The final break came when preparations for a second trip to the UK were thwarted when Laurie Pryor refused to participate, leading to his resignation from the group. Disappointed and dejected with their recent lack of progress and perceived loss of popularity, the group decided then to disband, announcing a series of final live appearances in Sydney and Melbourne.

1969: Breakup
After the shock announcement of the break-up in the 22 January Go-Set''' issue, The Twilights gave their last NSW concert performance at The Trocadero in Sydney. They were a last-minute inclusion in the Ray-o-Vac Batteries Spectacular, which featured an all-star line-up including The Groove, Johnny Farnham, The Dave Miller Set, The La De Das, Heart'n'Soul, Respect, Clapham Junction and The Executives, with comperes Ward Austin and Dal Myles. Five thousand fans attended, with thousands more reportedly turned away. Their last Melbourne concert was at Bertie's Discotheque.

Post break-up
Their two studio albums were briefly re-released ca 1969 on EMI's budget labels Music For Pleasure, but since that time none of their original recordings have been reissued by the label.

Interest in the band was considerably revived by a compilation of live recordings, Twilight Time, which was followed by the definitive 1989 Raven Records CD anthology The Way They Played, compiled and annotated by Glenn A. Baker.  In 2006, Aztec Music released a remastered CD anthology of their rare 1968 masterpiece Once Upon A Twilight, comprising both the mono and stereo mixes of the original LP.

Glenn Shorrock briefly worked as a manager and agent for Brisbane teen-pop group The Avengers and the A.M.B.O. agency. In late 1969, following the split of their previous band The Groop, Brian Cadd and Don Mudie invited Shorrock to become the lead singer of a new 'supergroup', Axiom; they recorded two albums and scored several hit singles before splitting in 1971. He spent two years in the UK, releasing several solo singles on the MAM Records label, doing backup vocals in the Cliff Richard touring band, before joining the UK-based multinational group Esperanto, with whom he recorded two albums. On his return to Australia at the start of 1975 he teamed with ex-Mississippi members Beeb Birtles and Graeham Goble to form Little River Band. They became the first Australia rock act to achieve major chart and sales success in the United States scored phenomenal success in the US later in the 1970s, with Shorrock as its lead singer. After leaving LRB in early 1982, he retreated from performing for a time, compering the ABC-TV music series Rock Arena, before releasing a solo album Villain of the Peace, then teaming again with Cadd under the name Blazing Salads. A double-album anthology The First Twenty Years, which included tracks from most phases of Shorrock's recording career was issued out in 1985. In 2000, he participated in a large-scale presentation of Beatles songs at the Sydney Opera House in 1998 with a rock band and full orchestra under the baton of Sir George Martin.

Terry Britten became a freelance songwriter and producer, working for Australian acts including Zoot, The Avengers and Ronnie Burns.  He released a solo single, "2,000 Weeks", before returning to England to develop a new four-piece band with fellow Australians Kevin Peek, Alan Tarney and Trevor Spencer (ex- James Taylor Move). This band, Quartet, released a single, "Now" on Decca before disbanding in late 1969 and recorded an album, Joseph which was never released. Britten then partnered with Brian Peacock (ex-Procession) in the group Homer, before concentrating on songwriting, sometimes in collaboration Tarney, Spencer and B. A. Robertson. He wrote several major hits for Cliff Richard, Tina Turner and Australian singer Christie Allen, as well as co-writing "Just Good Friends" with Graham Lyle of (Gallagher & Lyle) for Michael Jackson's Bad album.  He went on to win a Grammy Award for Tina Turner's "We Don't Need Another Hero", the theme to the movie Mad Max: Beyond Thunderdome. Britten continues to compose from his base in England but has returned to Australia on occasion for the various Twilights reunions.

Laurie Pryor became the drummer with Chain soon after leaving the Twilights, undertook various studio sessions and helped form the much-lauded early 1970s progressive rock band Healing Force with the late Charlie Tumahai. Pryor died in May 2010 after a long illness.

Peter Brideoake returned to Adelaide in 1969 and began studies in composition with Richard Meale at the Elder Conservatorium of Music at the University of Adelaide. Following his graduation with a Bachelor of Music (Hons.) he began teaching harmony and modern composition techniques at the Elder Conservatorium, and he has been a lecturer there since 1975. As well as teaching in composition studies, he has introduced a course in Chinese music as the result of an interest in the music, theatre and language of China. A special interest in an ancient Chinese zither (Ch'in) meant that after several periods of study in China, he became a proficient performer on this instrument. In 1978 he was awarded the John Bishop Memorial Commission; other commissioned works have been composed for the Sydney String Quartet, the Australian Chamber Orchestra, the Seymour Group, the Victorian String Quartet and, more recently, by percussionist Ryszard Pusz.

Reunions
Five of the original six members of the band reunited for a special Beatles tribute concert in Adelaide in 2000, and they reformed again for the hugely successful Long Way to the Top concert tour in 2002. The only member not present was Pryor, who could not participate due to illness.

On 28 March 2014, John Bywaters was the first inductee of the South Australian Music Hall of Fame. On 10 October 2014, Shorrock was also inducted, and McCartney, Brideoake and Britten followed in April 2015.

The surviving Twilights reunited for the all-star "Rock of Ages" concert promoted by Aztec Music at the Palais Theatre in St Kilda, Melbourne in 2011.

Personnel
Jeff Pretty – drummer in their very early days
Frank Barnard – drums (1964–65)
Peter Brideoake – rhythm guitar, vocals
Terry Britten – lead guitar, vocals
John Bywaters – bass
Clem "Paddy" McCartney – lead vocals
Laurie Pryor – drums (1965–69)
Glenn Shorrock – lead vocals

Discography
Albums
 The Twilights (Columbia 33OSX-7779) (reissued as Music For Pleasure MFP-8129)
 Once Upon a Twilight (Columbia OSX-7870 mono, SECO 7870 stereo) 1968
 Best of The Twilights (HMV OELP-9777)
 Twilight Time – Raven RVLP-08
 The Twilights: The Way They Played (Raven CD RVCD-03) 1989

EPs
 Bad Boy (Columbia SEGO-70129) 1966
 Needle in a Haystack (Columbia SEGO-70139) 1967
 Always (Columbia SEGO-70161) 1968

Singles
 "I'll Be Where You Are" / "I Don't Know Where The Wind Will Blow Me" (Columbia DO 4582) June 1965
 "Come on Home" / "Wanted To Sell" (Columbia DO 4610) Oct. 1965
 "If She Finds Out" / "John Hardy" (Columbia DO 4658) Feb. 1966
 "Baby Let Me Take You Home" / "You've Really Got A Hold on Me" (Columbia DO 4685) May 1966
 "Bad Boy" / "It's Dark" (Columbia DO 4698) Jun. 1966
 "Needle in a Haystack" / "I Won't Be The Same Without Her" (Columbia DO 4717) Aug. 1966
 "You Got Soul" / "Yes I Will" (Columbia DO 4742) Dec. 1966
 "What's Wrong with the Way I Live" / "9.50" (Columbia DO 4764) Feb. 1967
 "Young Girl" / "Time & Motion Study Man" (Columbia DO 4787) May 1967
 "Bowling Brings Out The Swinger in You" / "Bowling Brings Out The Swinger in You" (instrumental version) – EMI Custom PRS 1736 (promotional single) 1967
 "Cathy Come Home" / "The Way They Play" (Columbia DO 5030) Nov. 1967
 "Always" / "What A Silly Thing To Do" (Columbia DO 8361) May 1968
 "Tell Me Goodbye" / "Comin' On Down" (Columbia DO 8448) Aug. 1968
 "Sand in the Sandwiches" / "Lotus" (Columbia DO 8602) Nov. 1968
 "2,000 Weeks" /" Bargain Day" (Columbia DO 8711) 1969 (Terry Britten solo)

Awards and nominations
Go-Set Pop Poll
The Go-Set Pop Poll was coordinated by teen-oriented pop music newspaper, Go-Set'' and was established in February 1966 and conducted an annual poll during 1966 to 1972 of its readers to determine the most popular personalities.

|-
| 1966
| themselves 
| Best Australian Group
| style="background:silver;"| 2nd
|-
| 1967
| themselves 
| Top Australian Group 
| style="background:silver;"| 2nd
|-
| 1968
| themselves 
| Best Australian Group
| style="background:gold;"| 1st
|-

South Australian Music Awards
The South Australian Music Awards are annual awards that exist to recognise, promote and celebrate excellence in the South Australian contemporary music industry. They commenced in 2012. The South Australian Music Hall of Fame celebrates the careers of successful music industry personalities.

! 
|-
| 2018
|The Twilights
| Hall of Fame
| 
| 
|-

References

External links
The Twilights at Nostalgia Central
MILESAGO - Groups & Solo Artists - The Twilights
Passegen Hem

Musical groups established in 1964
Musical groups disestablished in 1969
Australian psychedelic rock music groups
Australian rock music groups
Musical groups from Adelaide